The 2014–15 Miami hurricanes women's basketball team represented the University of Miami during the 2014–15 NCAA Division I women's basketball season. The Hurricanes, led by tenth-year head coach Katie Meier, play their home games at the BankUnited Center and were members of the Atlantic Coast Conference. They finished the season 20–13, 8–8 in ACC play to finish in eighth place. They advanced to the quarterfinals of the ACC women's tournament where they lost to Notre Dame. They received an at-large bid of the NCAA women's tournament where they upset Washington in the first round before losing to Iowa in the second round.

Roster

Media
All home games and conference road games will be broadcast on WVUM as part of the Miami Hurricanes Learfield Sports contract.

Schedule

|-
!colspan=12 style=| Exhibition

|-
!colspan=12 style=| Non-conference Regular Season

|-
!colspan=12 style=| ACC Regular Season

|-
|-
!colspan=12 style=| ACC Women's Tournament

|-
!colspan=12 style=| NCAA Women's Tournament

Source

Rankings
2014–15 NCAA Division I women's basketball rankings

See also
2014–15 Miami Hurricanes men's basketball team

References

Miami Hurricanes women's basketball seasons
Miami
Miami